Agnes Bulmer (31 August 1775 – 20 August 1836) was an English poet. She is believed to have written the longest epic poem ever written by a woman. The piece, Messiah's Kingdom, took over nine years to complete.

Biography

Early life
Agnes Collinson was born on 31 August 1775 in London, England. Her parents were Edward and Elizabeth Collinson. Bulmer had two other sisters and she was the youngest. The family lived on Lombard Street in London.

Bulmer's parents were Methodists, and were friends with John Wesley. Bulmer was baptized by Wesley and she was admitted to his school, in December 1789. She attended the City Road Chapel, and remained a member of the society until her death. She was also a devout patron of the Church of England.

The family was defined as middle class, and Bulmer's education provided her access to literature, which she enjoyed very much. By the age of twelve she had read Edward Young's Night-Thoughts. It was a major influence on her own style. By age fourteen she had published her first work, On the Death of Charles Wesley. Wesley sent her a personal note, thanking her for the piece, he also advised her to "Beware of pride; beware of flattery; suffer none to commend you to your face; remember, one good temper is of more value, in the sight of God, than a thousand good verses. All you want is to have the mind that was in Christ, and to walk as Christ walked."

In school, she befriended Elizabeth Richie Mortimer and Sarah Wesley, the latter being the wife of Charles Wesley. She studied under Hester Ann Rogers in school, and would eventually write an elegy upon Rogers death.

Mid-life

She married Joseph Bulmer in 1793. He was a London-based warehouse worker and merchant, also involved in the Methodist church. He was financially successful and popular within the church, and other non-church related local communities.

The couple socialized frequently, spending time with the likes of Adam Clarke, Joseph Benson, Jabez Bunting, and Richard Watson. Clarke was fond of Bulmer, and stated that she "astonished" him with her intellect and skill. She was described as being a "match for men," in Wesleyan Methodist Magazine regarding her intelligence and interests. However, she was often described as being equal yet "feminine" in her qualities by writers, showing that while men believed her to be equal, she was still "domestic" and "delicate," according to William Bunting, and other writers.

Later life

Bulmer taught at City Road Chapel, until 1822, and wrote. She was involved in social activities, including the Ladies Working Society, and also did visits at hospitals and with the poor. During this period she worked on Bible stories for children, which were published as Scripture Histories. Joseph Bulmer died on 23 July 1822 from an illness. Bulmer's mother died also. She entered into a deep period of mourning, and wrote a lot of poetry related to death.

Bulmer became sick during a trip to the Isle of Wight, and died on 20 August 1836. William Bunting presided over the funeral. She is buried in City Road Chapel.

Work

Her earliest published work was On the Death of Charles Wesley, in 1788. Bulmer wrote an elegy for Hester Ann Rogers, after Rogers died in 1793. The piece was published in 1794. She wrote Messiah's Kingdom, an epic poem. The latter was published in a series of twelve books, in 1833. Messiahs' Kingdom is considered the longest poem ever written by a woman. The piece took nine years to complete, with over 14,000 lines. Her children's biblical stories, Scripture Histories, were regularly published in Methodist publications. She wrote her first biography in 1835, about her friend Elizabeth Mortimer, The Memoirs of Elizabeth Mortimer.

Further reading

Collinson, Anne Ross. Memoir of Mrs. Agnes Bulmer. England: London (1837).

References

Attribution

1775 births
1836 deaths
19th-century English poets
English women poets
Christian poets
Writers from London
English Methodists
Wesleyan Methodists
People from the City of London
Women religious writers
19th-century English women writers
19th-century English writers
19th-century British writers